The Hushan or Tiger Mountain Great Wall, is a section of the Ming Great Wall in Kuandian Manchu Autonomous County, Liaoning, China. The wall runs for about 1,200 metres over Hushan ("Tiger Mountain"). 

The wall starts 15 km northeast of Dandong city, directly beside the China–North Korea border. It then climbs steeply up to a height of 146.3 metres before descending on the other side of Hushan and finishing at a car park. 

Numerous Ming dynasty records and poems mentioned a "border wall" that reached the banks of Yalu River, forming a part of Ming's defense system on the northern frontier. The date of its construction was documented by the Ming Shilu as the 15th year of Chenghua era (AD 1479). Archives of Andong (Dandong) county put the wall's location to the north of the Ai River, in the Hushan area. A series of surveys in late 1980s and early 1990s led by architectural historian  identified the ruins at Hushan as the site of the eastern terminus of this Great Wall section.

Ruins of older fortresses have been identified at Hushan, dating back to Han dynasty and Goguryeo eras. Similar sites have also been discovered elsewhere in Liaoning, as well as in North Pyongan and Chagang provinces, North Korea. The site of a historical city known as Posuo (婆娑) or Bakjak (泊汋, 박작) lies in close proximity at present-day Jiuliancheng, to the south of Hushan.

On the other hand, North and South Korea academics show skepticisms on the historical existence of the Hushan great wall due to lack of evidence.

See also
 Cheolli Jangseong

References

Great Wall of China
Walls
World Heritage Sites in China
Chinese architectural history
Buildings and structures in Dandong
Tourist attractions in Liaoning